Yevhenii Barabanov (Барабанов Євген Олегович; born July 24, 1993) is a Ukrainian amateur boxer in the welterweight division.

He won a bronze medal at the 2017 European Championships in Kharkiv.

He is a four-time Ukrainian champion: 2012, 2013, 2015, 2016.

Notes

References

1993 births
Living people
Ukrainian male boxers
Boxers at the 2019 European Games
European Games medalists in boxing
European Games bronze medalists for Ukraine
Welterweight boxers
Sportspeople from Kyiv
21st-century Ukrainian people